El Asón was an independent weekly newspaper published from Ramales, Spain, in the period 1908–1911.

References

1908 establishments in Spain
1911 disestablishments in Spain
Defunct newspapers published in Spain
Defunct weekly newspapers
Newspapers established in 1908
Publications disestablished in 1911
Spanish-language newspapers
Weekly newspapers published in Spain